Pseudosesia oberthuri, the golden clearwing, is a moth of the family Sesiidae. It is found in the northern part of Australia.

The wingspan is ca. 20 mm.

The larvae feed on Ampelocissus acetosa, among other plants.

External links
Australian Faunal Directory
Classification of the Superfamily Sesioidea (Lepidoptera: Ditrysia)
New records and a revised checklist of the Australian clearwing moths (Lepidoptera: Sesiidae)

Sesiidae
Moths described in 1918